Ona Juknevičienė (born April 28, 1955, in Trakai) is a Lithuanian politician and former Member of the European Parliament, part of the European Democrat Party and Alliance of Liberals and Democrats for Europe.

References
 Ona JUKNEVIČIENĖ. European Parliament.

1955 births
Living people
People from Trakai
Labour Party (Lithuania) MEPs
21st-century Lithuanian politicians
MEPs for Lithuania 2004–2009
Women MEPs for Lithuania